The Cambridge University Conservative Association, or CUCA, is a long-established student political society founded 1921, as a Conservative Association for students at Cambridge University, although it has earlier roots in the late nineteenth century. CUCA is not affiliated with the nationwide youth branch of the Conservative Party, the Young Conservatives, but is a fully independent Association distinct from other Conservative youth organisations. The association puts on a range of events for its members each term, notably its ‘Port & Policy’ debates, as well as addresses from a number of high-profile speakers.

History
The earliest incarnation of the Cambridge University Conservative Association was established in 1882, but lasted only a few months before dissolving. By 1884, Cambridge Conservatives launched a new group – the Cambridge University Carlton Club. This served primarily as a dining society, and existed for the next twenty years. However, shortly after the Conservative government's landslide defeat in the 1906 general election, the Cambridge University Carlton Club dissolved, just as its predecessor had. There was no Conservative student organisation in Cambridge for the remainder of the Edwardian period, and the First World War saw party political activity suspended.

The present-day Cambridge University Conservative Association was founded in 1921, with its inaugural annual dinner held on 24 January of that year. In 1928, the annual St. John's College magazine The Eagle defined "a Cambridge Conservative [association member as] the proud possessor of a certain tie, obtained by signifying with a subscription his refusal or his inability to think out any social question."

CUCA alumni had considerable influence on British politics in the 1980s and 1990s, with the rise to prominence of the 'Cambridge Mafia' including cabinet ministers Leon Brittan, Kenneth Clarke, Norman Fowler, John Gummer, Michael Howard, and Norman Lamont, who had dominated CUCA and the Cambridge Union in the early 1960s.  Considerable overlap between the officeholders of the two societies continues to the present day, while various present-day Cabinet officials and Members of Parliament are CUCA alumni.

Activities
CUCA is principally a political events association, holding regular speaker meetings, social events and debates.

In recent years, CUCA has attempted to play a larger part in Cambridge University-wide politics.  Members of CUCA have stood for election as Presidents of the Cambridge University Students' Union (CUSU) in recent years, whilst CUCA itself has lobbied CUSU Council directly.  The association remains disaffiliated from the national Conservative Party, and has instead pitched itself as a bastion of philosophical conservatism for members of Cambridge University.

CUCA's current membership costs are £25 for life membership, and £20 for annual membership.

Debates 
The association's premier debating event is 'Port and Policy', which is held around four times a term.  In its current format, three motions are presented. Typically the final motion is tongue-in-cheek or less serious: the divine right of kings is a recurring topic, as is the health of Western Civilisation.  After speeches for and against the motion, the floor is invited to participate via floor speeches.  Once the debate has concluded, voting occurs by acclamation in proposition and opposition. For many years Port and Policy had been a roundtable discussion, with the adversarial format only introduced in 2016, but this change has already driven attendance to, on occasion, over 100.

Speaker events 
CUCA holds regular speaker events with both Conservative politicians and right-wing thinkers.  Speakers that have addressed the association in recent terms have included Jacob Rees-Mogg, John Major, Norman Tebbit and Dominic Grieve. CUCA has a well-established history of attracting a high calibre of speakers, often including Cabinet ministers, think-tank experts and former Prime Ministers.

Social events 
Much of CUCA's calendar is focused on social events, which have included Cava & Chocolate, Port & Cheese and Garden Parties amongst many others.  A termly highlight is the Chairman's Dinner, which marks the handing over of the leadership of the association from one chairman to another.

Publication of 'Freshers' Guides' 
CUCA has twice published a 'Freshers' Guide', an introductory magazine distributed to first-years designed to give instruction and advice on Cambridge student life.

The association has argued that many unavoidable aspects of student life at Cambridge (formal dinners, navigating a multitude of student societies, language) are ignored by bodies such as CUSU and College JCRs for fear of being seen to perpetuate elitism.  CUCA has argued that this approach itself perpetuates elitism, and instead aims to celebrate the 'quirks and curiosities' of Cambridge by the production and dissemination of accessible advice.

The Guide returned in 2016, published as 'The Cambridge Directory'.  Edited by Nicholas Taylor and Jack Drury, it offered advice on shopping, formalwear, restaurants, culture and etiquette.  Within a week of publication, the 'Directory' had not only picked up press attention, but had been downloaded over 6000 times.  The editors observed that Freshers had approached them praising the content of the Directory for "providing answers to questions they'd have felt awkward asking."

Lobbying CUSU and remembrance 
In 2017, a member of CUCA stood for election to the presidency of CUSU: his membership of CUCA featured heavily in the election reporting. In 2018, another member of CUCA stood for election to the same post.  His membership of CUCA also featured heavily in the election reporting. Both individuals insisted throughout their campaigns that membership of CUCA was incidental to the post for which they stood.

In October 2018, members of CUCA took a motion to CUSU Council proposing that CUSU do more to recognise the war dead.  The motion was rejected.  This decision by CUSU Council resulted in a significant press fallout.  The then chairman of CUCA, Timur Coskun, appeared on several national news outlets to discuss the issue of remembrance.

Committee make-up 
Following recent reforms, CUCA is run by an executive of nine members: the Chairman, Vice-Chairman, Junior Treasurer, Campaigns Officer, Communications and Publicity Officer, Speakers Officer, Speakers Officer-Elect, Librarian (previously known as Secretary) and Social Events Officer. Following constitutional changes passed in Lent 2009, the Vice-Chairman automatically becomes Chairman in the term following their Vice-Chairmanship.

CUCA members may also join the committee by applying to become co-opted members, whereby they sit on the committee without an official remit.

Notable events

1938: Pro-appeasement
In 1938, CUCA hosted Sir Samuel Hoare as he gave a vigorous defence of Neville Chamberlain's policy of appeasement towards Hitler at Munich, calling it "a great achievement" and "the height of exaltation".

1956: Support for the Suez Invasion
In reporting and listing widespread student protests across Britain against the invasion of Suez in 1956, The Times noted that, instead, the "Cambridge University Conservative Association sent telegrams of support to the Prime Minister (Sir Anthony Eden) and Foreign Secretary (Selwyn Lloyd)."

1960-1: Visits by Sir Oswald Mosley
In 1961, the future Conservative leader Michael Howard resigned from the committee in protest at the decision of Kenneth Clarke, the then chairman, to invite Sir Oswald Mosley to address the association for the second year running. (The previous year's speech by Mosley had been marred by a heckler throwing jelly at him.)

1965–1998: Allegations of electoral malpractice
The society has, in the past, occasionally hit the headlines of both national and local papers over electoral disputes:

In 1965,The Times reported that CUCA's Secretary was forced to resign after a four and a half-hour meeting deemed some of his election methods to have been forbidden.

In 1985, The Times again reported that eight committee members of CUCA had "resigned after allegations of electoral irregularities", with one committee member having a tape recording which he claimed proved the allegations.

In early 1998, Varsity published a story alleging that "weeks of bitter in-fighting culminated in allegations of election-rigging and a move to censure the society's most senior members". However, Varsity conceded that the subsequent motions of censure themselves had no reasons formally attached to them by their proposers and that some signatories were unaware of why they were supporting them.

However, Varsity articles on CUCA elections have themselves come under fire in the past: following an Easter 2000 article, "Conservatives in Corruption Crisis", which accused the then-chairman of 'vote-buying', the paper was forced to print a front-page "Rectification" and apology, after threats of legal action.

1969: Alleged elitism
In January 2010, former Conservative MP and gay rights campaigner Matthew Parris admitted that on arriving at Cambridge in 1969 he had joined the Liberals, remarking that "I couldn't bring myself to join the CU Conservative Association because they were such braying, cravat-wearing, port-gargling, social-networking prats." This prompted a letter to The Times signed by CUCA's Registrar who quipped that "at any one meeting of CU Conservative Association, only one person should ever wear a cravat to avoid ostentation." Parris had previously described CUCA in his 2002 autobiography as "a dreadful shower, strutting careerists of distinctly mixed calibre, forever infighting, networking and elbowing their way through a scene which appeared more social than political."

1985-6: Visits by Enoch Powell
A visit by Enoch Powell in March 1985 provoked resignations on CUCA's committee, and when Powell returned in December 1986, he was heckled by non-Conservative students. CUCA had also come under criticism for Powell's 1985 appearance in the New Statesman, which argued that Powell's extreme views were indicative of CUCA's alleged authoritarianism, and the paper asserting the (short-lived) "Cambridge University Monday Club form part of an unholy alliance with elements of the Left and the now-discredited Cambridge University Conservative Association, who are united in their fervent, even violent opposition to libertarians. Perhaps it is this bizarre grouping which deserves investigation."

2012: BBC 'Wonderland' documentary
On 9 August 2012, the BBC broadcast the documentary Young, Bright and on the Right as part of its Wonderland series. The episode followed two student political activists from deprived backgrounds, one of whom was former CUCA Committee member Chris Monk. The documentary attracted much press attention in the days following the broadcast, particularly at Monk's remark "The whole point of the [Cambridge University] Conservative Association is it gives you a chance to pretend to be a member of the upper classes for an afternoon".

CUCA responded with a statement on its website, stressing its "disappointment that a documentary has aired which misrepresents Cambridge University Conservative Association...Contrary to the suggestions of the programme, CUCA is unfalteringly open to all.".

2016: Save the Class Lists 
It was widely speculated after the victory of 'Save the Class Lists' in the Class Lists referendum that CUCA political machinery had been deployed by the campaign.

2017: Burning money in front of the homeless 
On 2 February 2017, the communications officer on CUCA's executive committee was filmed on Snapchat attempting to set fire to a £20 note in front of a homeless person. The video showed the student dressed in white tie whilst trying to set the banknote alight, before the camera panned to the homeless person. The incident was reported to have taken place on Bridge Street, Cambridge. The event was reported to be reminiscent of the rumoured initiation process for Oxford's infamous Bullingdon Club, where students are said to have to burn a £50 note in front of a homeless person.

CUCA issued a statement about the incident saying they wished to "disassociate [them]selves from the individual and his behaviour". CUCA maintained throughout the following media storm that the communications officer had not been at a CUCA event, and they had no explanation for his being in white tie.  Before the story broke, a meeting was held between CUCA officials and the communications officer: as part of their first response, CUCA announced that the communications officer had resigned both his post and membership of the association in that meeting. In the event's aftermath, the then chairman of CUCA, Jim Matheson, wrote that he was "convinced that CUCA [had] something positive and healthy to offer the fabric of the university."

2018: James Delingpole at a Chairman's Dinner 
In Lent 2018, it was widely reported that attendees at chairman's Dinner had walked out during the address from James Delingpole after he made a number of unpalatable jokes. Delingpole is reported to have advised attendees to raise enough money to pay for their children's private education, and joked about the sex abuse perpetuated by Jimmy Savile.  Delingpole subsequently defended himself in The Spectator, while CUCA released a statement stating that they did not support the viewpoints that Delingpole stated.

General press comments on CUCA
In 1980, Private Eye condemned Timothy Eggar, a Conservative MP and former CUCA chairman, as "one of those unpleasant political operators that Cambridge University Conservative Association alone knows how to breed."

In November 1998, it was claimed in Varsity that outgoing chairmen of CUCA were awarded a pair of silver cufflinks, with one CUCA committee member quipping that "several of the last Chairmen only served their terms of office so that they could get the cufflinks."

Notable alumni

Members of Parliament

 Spencer Batiste, MP, CUCA chairman (Easter 1967)
 Humphrey Berkeley, MP, CUCA chairman (1948)
 Victoria Boswell, MP, CUCA chairman (Easter 1994)
 Sir Antony Buck, QC, MP, CUCA chairman (Lent 1952)
 Sir Geoffrey G. Butler, MP, CUCA chairman (Lent 192?)
 Kenneth Clarke, CH, QC, MP, CUCA chairman (Michaelmas 1961)
 Sir Nick Clegg, MP, CUCA Member
 Sir Stafford Cripps, CH, QC, FRS, MP, CUCA Member
 Sir Tam Dalyell, Baronet, MP, CUCA chairman (Michaelmas 1954)
 James Davies, MP, CUCA chairman (Easter 2001)
 Timothy Eggar, MP, CUCA chairman (Michaelmas 1972)
 Roger Evans, MP, CUCA chairman (Lent 1969)
 Suella Fernandes, MP, CUCA chairman (Easter 2000)
 Denzil Freeth, MBE, MP, CUCA chairman (Easter 1951)
 Greg Hands, MP, CUCA chairman (Lent 1988)
 David Lidington CBE, MP, CUCA chairman (Michaelmas 1978)
 Sir Peter Lloyd, MP, CUCA chairman (Michaelmas 1959)
 David Mellor, QC, MP, CUCA chairman (Easter 1970)
 Andrew Mitchell, MP, CUCA chairman (Michaelmas 1977)
 Archie Norman, MP, CUCA chairman (Michaelmas 1974)
 Sir John Nott, KCB, MP, CUCA Member
 Michael Portillo, MP, CUCA Member
 William Powell, MP, CUCA chairman (Lent 1970)
 Graham Stuart, MP, CUCA chairman (Easter 1985)
 John Watts, MP, CUCA chairman (Easter 1969)
 Sir Peter Viggers, CUCA chairman (Easter 1960)

Peers

 John Biffen, PC, DL, MP, CUCA chairman (Lent 1953)
 Norman Blackwell, CUCA chairman (Easter 1973)
 Nick Bourne, AM, CUCA Treasurer
 Leon Brittan, PC, QC, DL, MP, CUCA chairman (Lent 1960)
 Rab Butler, MP, CUCA Member
 Hon. Jocelyn Arthur Pike Pease, Hereditary Peer, CUCA chairman (1929-1930)
 Hugh Dykes, MP, CUCA chairman (Lent 1962)
 Howard Flight, MP, CUCA chairman (Michaelmas 1968)
 Norman Fowler, Kt., PC, MP, CUCA chairman (Michaelmas 1960)
 John Selwyn Gummer, PC, MP, CUCA chairman (Easter 1961)
 David Hacking, 3rd Baron Hacking, CUCA Member
 Geoffrey Howe, MP, CUCA chairman (Lent 1951)
 Michael Howard, MP, CUCA Committee Member
 Douglas Hurd, CH, CBE, PC, MP, CUCA chairman (Michaelmas 1951)
 Norman Lamont, PC, MP, CUCA chairman (Easter 1963)
 Ian Lang, PC, MP, CUCA Member
 Selwyn Lloyd, CH, CBE, TD, PC, QC, DL, CUCA Member
 Viscount Monckton, Hereditary Peer, CUCA Treasurer (1973)
 Ian Orr-Ewing, OBE, MP, CUCA chairman (Easter 1958)
 Stephen Parkinson, Baron Parkinson of Whitley Bay, CUCA chairman (Lent 2003)
 Rafton Pounder, MP, CUCA chairman (Lent 1954)
 David Prior, MP, CUCA chairman (Lent 1976)
 Richard Ryder, OBE, PC, MP, CUCA chairman (Lent 1971)
 Norman St.John-Stevas, PC, FRSL, MP, CUCA Member
 Peter Temple-Morris, CUCA chairman (Lent 1961)
 Christopher Tugendhat, CUCA Member
 Adair Turner, Lord Turner, CUCA chairman
 Willie Whitelaw, Viscount, KT, CH, MC, PC, DL, CUCA Member

Other

 Mohammad Amin, chairman of Conservative Muslim Forum, CUCA Member
 Godfrey Barker, Journalist & Author, CUCA chairman (Easter 1966)
 Sir David Eady, High Court Judge, CUCA chairman (Lent 1964)
 Tim Kevan, Barrister, CUCA chairman (Michaelmas 1992)
 Miles Millar, Screenwriter & Producer, CUCA chairman (Easter 1989)
 Sir Simon Milton, Leader of Westminster City Council, CUCA chairman (Michaelmas 1982)
 Peter Riddell, CBE, PC, Commissioner for Public Appointments, CUCA Treasurer (1967)
 Andrew Roberts, Historian, CUCA chairman (Michaelmas 1984)
 Charles Hampden-Turner, Philosopher, CUCA chairman (Michaelmas 1957)
 Milo Yiannopoulos, Polemicist and Writer, CUCA Member (2010)

See also
 Cambridge University Labour Club (CULC)
 Cambridge University Liberal Association (CULA)
 Oxford University Conservative Association (OUCA)

References

External links
 Cambridge University Conservative Association

Conservative
Student organizations established in 1921
Student political organizations
Conservative organisations in the United Kingdom
1921 establishments in England